The Eurométropole is a single day cycling race held annually in Belgium and France. The race was previously known as the Circuit Franco–Belge until 2010, as the Tour de Wallonie-Picarde in 2011 and as the Tour de l'Eurométropole from 2012 to 2015. From 2005 to 2015 the Tour de l'Eurométropole was a 2.1-ranked stage race of the UCI Europe Tour.

Since 2016, the event has transformed from a stage race to a single day 1.1 race and was included in the inaugural Belgian Road Cycling Cup. The race starts in Poperinge, West Flanders, and finishes in Tournai, Hainaut, and is now only run on Belgian soil.

Winners

External links
  

Cycle races in Belgium
Cycle races in France
UCI Europe Tour races
Recurring sporting events established in 1924
1924 establishments in Belgium
1924 establishments in France